Jules Martin  (27 February 1824, in Vevey – 21 May 1875) was a Swiss politician and president of the Swiss National Council (1856).

External links 
 
 

1824 births
1875 deaths
People from Vevey
Swiss Calvinist and Reformed Christians
Members of the Council of States (Switzerland)
Members of the National Council (Switzerland)
Presidents of the National Council (Switzerland)